Newham is a London borough.

Newham may also refer to:

Places
 Newham, Lincolnshire, a location in the United Kingdom
 Newham, Belsay, now in Belsay parish, Northumberland, England
 Newham, Ellingham, Northumberland, England; see Newham railway station
 Newham, Victoria, Australia
 Coulby Newham, Middlesbrough, North Yorkshire, England

People with the surname
 Billy Newham (1860–1944), English cricketer
 Edgar Newham (1914–1995), Australian rugby league footballer
 Jessica Anne Newham (born 1991), an Australian singer and songwriter known by her stage name Betty Who

See also
 Newnham (disambiguation)
 Newsham (disambiguation)